Hugh McKean (October 27, 1967 – October 30, 2022) was an American politician from Loveland, Colorado. A Republican, McKean represented Colorado House of Representatives District 51, which encompasses Loveland and the surrounding area. He was first elected in 2016.

Before his election as a state representative, McKean served as a city councilor in Loveland.

McKean was elected house minority leader for the 73rd General Assembly and served from January 13, 2021, until his death in October 2022.

McKean died of a heart attack at his home on October 30, 2022, three days after his 55th birthday. At the time of his death, he was seeking a fourth term in the November 8, 2022, elections, and was unopposed on the ballot.

References

External links
 State House website

1967 births
2022 deaths
21st-century American politicians
Colorado city council members
People from Loveland, Colorado
Republican Party members of the Colorado House of Representatives